Tonight Nobody Goes Home (Jin tian bu hui jia) is a 1996 Taiwanese comedy film directed by Sylvia Chang. The film was selected as the Taiwanese entry for the Best Foreign Language Film at the 69th Academy Awards, but was not accepted as a nominee.

Cast
 Sihung Lung as Dr. Chen Pinyan
 Gua Ah-leh as Mrs. Chen
 Winston Chao as Chen Siming
 Rene Liu as Chen Xiaoqi
 Jordan Chan as Changgang

See also
 List of submissions to the 69th Academy Awards for Best Foreign Language Film
 List of Taiwanese submissions for the Academy Award for Best Foreign Language Film

References

External links
 

1996 films
1996 comedy films
Taiwanese comedy films
1990s Mandarin-language films
Films directed by Sylvia Chang